Rick Rose (born July 19, 1978) is an American Inventor,  jewelry designer and businessman. Rose owns Roseark – a jewelry lifestyle boutique in Los Angeles, California. Was named one of Los Angeles' most stylish men in the April 2012 issue of Angeleno Magazine.

Biography

Early life
Rose was born in Miller, South Dakota to Karen and Fred F. Rose III. After his parents divorced, he grew up between South Dakota and Iowa while his father was in Miami. His family moved to Eden Prairie, Minnesota just before his First year of high school. At Eden Prairie High School, Rose was a two sport letterman: in track (All Conference, All Region and No. 1 ranking in the State ), and football (team ranked No. 1 in the State). Holds one of the top 100 all time fastest times in Minnesota state history in the 110 Hurdles

Rose holds a BA from Boston University and is a graduate of the Gemological Institute of America as an Accredited Jewelry Professional.

Personal life
Rose married Roseark co-founder, Kathy Rose on October 7, 2006  and had two children: a daughter, Saffron (born 2006) and son, Quinn (born 2008).  The marriage lasted six years.

On May 7, 2015, Rose married Kayla Baugh. The couple have a daughter, Easton (born 2015) and a son, Ryder (born 2019).

Business

Roseark
Rick Rose helped start Kathy Rose's jewelry line, Kaviar Jewelry in 2001. While the name Kaviar Jewelry was changed to Kathy Rose for Roseark, the designs continue to attract the eyes of celebrities like Courteney Cox, Lindsay Lohan, Penélope Cruz, Nicole Richie, Mary-Kate Olsen, Rihanna and many others. In 2003, he opened Roseark, a Los Angeles jewelry and art gallery, which is located at the corner of Crescent Heights Boulevard and Santa Monica Boulevard in West Hollywood. In June 2010, Rose opened a second store in Santa Monica on Montana Ave.  The Santa Monica location was open until April 15, 2013.

Rose was featured in the April 2012 issue of  Angeleno Magazine in its "Men of Style" feature.

In February 2015, Roseark launched Roseark Showroom, a promotion and representation division.

Patents

Film and television

Television
Rose started his television career working on the reality based television shows World's Wildest Police Videos for 20th Century Fox Television, Real TV, The Mole and Murder in Small Town X.

2006 saw the Universal Studios release of Bad City, which he co-wrote and co-produced. In April 2007, his film Hollywood, was an official selection of the Palm Beach International Film Festival.

Acting

Rose began his acting career working as a day player on Passions and on the 20th Century Fox feature film Bedazzled. He was then called as a stand in for Ben Affleck on the feature film Pearl Harbor, but was instead offered a three-day extra role. On the first day of work, Rose was picked by director Michael Bay to be on camera in a featured role as a 'Danny Pilot', a job that lasted for three months of principal photography.

Filmography

Actor
Pearl Harbor (2001) ('Danny Pilot')
Pranksters (2002) (C.K.)
Hollywood (2006) (OWEN)

Director
Pranksters (2002)
Hollywood (2006)
Addicted State (2008)

Producer
Pranksters (2002)
Hollywood (2006)
Bad City (2006)
Addicted State (2008)

Writer
Pranksters (2002)
Hollywood (2006)
Bad City (2006)

References

External links
 

1978 births
Living people
21st-century American inventors
American patent holders
American male actors
American film directors
American film producers
American designers
Boston University alumni
American male writers
People from Miller, South Dakota